The 2019 Emirates Cup was a pre-season football friendly tournament hosted by Arsenal at its home ground, the Emirates Stadium. It was the tenth Emirates Cup, an invitational competition inaugurated in 2007. Held on 28 July 2019, the participants were Arsenal (men's and women's), Bayern Munich (women's only) and Lyon (men's only). In this edition, a new one-day format was introduced, with Arsenal women competing for the first time.

Background
The Emirates Cup was inaugurated in July 2007 after Arsenal finalised plans to stage a pre-season competition at its home ground. The competition is named after Arsenal's main sponsor Emirates; the airline's association with the football club began in 2004. Arsenal won the first tournament, which was attended by over 110,000 people across the two days.

Summary
The tournament began when the Arsenal women's side took on Bayern Munich, and concluded following the Arsenal men's side match against Lyon. Both games were played at the Emirates Stadium in London on 28 July 2019.

Matches

Women's Match

Men's Match

References 

2019
Emirates Cup
Emirates Cup
Emirates Cup